Verfeil is the name of the following communes in France:

 Verfeil, Haute-Garonne, in the Haute-Garonne department
 Verfeil, Tarn-et-Garonne, in the Tarn-et-Garonne department